Turatia is a moth genus in the family Autostichidae.

Species
 Turatia arenacea Gozmány, 2000
 Turatia argillacea Gozmány, 2000
 Turatia chretieni Gorzmány, 2000
 Turatia foeldvarii (Gozmány, 1959)
 Turatia iranica Gozmány, 2000
 Turatia morettii (Turati, 1926)
 Turatia namibiella Derra, 2011
 Turatia psameticella (Rebel, 1914)
 Turatia psammella (Amsel, 1933)
 Turatia scioneura (Meyrick, 1929)
 Turatia scutigera Gozmány, 2000
 Turatia serratina (Gozmány, 1967)
 Turatia striatula Gozmány, 2000
 Turatia tenebrata Gozmány, 2000
 Turatia turpicula Gozmány, 2000
 Turatia yemenensis Derra, 2008

References

 
Holcopogoninae